De Taali (translation: Hi-5) is a 2008 Indian comedy film. It stars Riteish Deshmukh, Aftab Shivdasani, Ayesha Takia and Rimi Sen in the main roles. The movie is a remake of the 2001 film Saving Silverman.  It is directed by Eeshwar Nivas and produced by Ravi Walia. The film revolves around three childhood friends Abhi (Aftab Shivdasani), Amu (Ayesha Takia) and Paglu (Ritesh Deshmukh) who have grown together and when Karthika (Rimi Sen) comes in their life, the whole dynamics of their friendship changes. The film was initially titled Jalsa. De Taali was released on 20 June 2008.

Plot
Abhishek 'Abhi' (Aftab Shivdasani), Paresh 'Paglu' (Ritesh Deshmukh) and Amrita 'Amu' (Ayesha Takia) are best friends since their childhood. Abhi's father (Anupam Kher) is a very rich businessman, and his only son has no interest in work. Abhi has had many girlfriends, but none of them lasted long. Paglu and Abhi's father tells Amu to marry Abhi because they know each other very well. One day Abhi comes and tells Amu that he loves someone that is his childhood friend; Amu thinks that she is the girl whom Abhi loves and she, too, falls in love with him.

Abhi later reveals that Kartika (Rimi Sen) is whom he loves. Karthika is actually after his money. Amu is heartbroken. Amu and Paglu start hating her and try to get them separated. Abhi gets angry with them and decides to marry her in another country. At the airport Amu hits Kartika and she falls unconscious. Amu and Paglu kidnap Kartika and force her to write a letter to Abhi saying that she doesn't love him. Paglu tells Abhi that Amu is the right girl for her, and Abhi falls in love with her. Paglu, with Karthika, still kidnapped, finds out that her name is Anjali, not Karthika. She is not in love with Abhi but with his money, and she has a history of cheating people for money. Paglu then frees her and she tells Abhi about the kidnapping. Abhi is unhappy hearing this and decides to marry Karthika anyway. On the wedding day, before Paglu tries to stop them from getting them married he meets a few people whom karthika had already betrayed; Abhi gets angry and tells Paglu and Amu to get out. The next day, Abhi comes back, apologizes to them and says that he isn't married. He tells them that yesterday when they left Anjali told him that she has learned a lot from the time Paglu and Amu kept her in captivity. She apologizes that she can't marry him and that Amu is the right girl for him. Abhi proposes to Amu. Later, Paglu ends up with the changed Anjali.

Cast 
 Ritesh Deshmukh as Paresh “Paglu” Gurudev
 Aftab Shivdasani as Abhishek “Abhi” Aggarwal
 Ayesha Takia as Amrita “Amu”
 Rimi Sen as Anjali Nahata / Karthika Rai
 Anupam Kher as Mr. Agarwal, Abhishek's father
 Mukul Dev as Sunil
 Pavan Malhotra as Professor Mhatre
 Rasika Joshi as Mrs. Moolchand Nahata
 Sanjay Narvekar as Venkat
 Saurabh Shukla as Landord Godbole

Special Appearances 
Neha Dhupia as Sarah
Anjana Sukhani as Anita 
Hrishitaa Bhatt as Tanya

Music

The music was conducted by the duo Vishal–Shekhar.

Track listing

Reception 
The film did not really take off at the box office. And to add to its woes the reviews were not too good either. However actor Riteish Deshmukh seems to have pleased everyone with his performance as he got some great reviews. Noyon Jyoti Parasara of AOL India said, "Truly this movie is Ritesh's. Ritesh has already established himself as a good comic actor and De Taali seconds that."

References

External links 
 
 
 De Taali at IndiaFM

2008 films
2000s Hindi-language films
Films scored by Vishal–Shekhar
Films directed by Eeshwar Nivas
Indian buddy comedy films
2000s buddy comedy films
Indian remakes of American films
2008 comedy films